Daviesia decurrens, commonly known as prickly bitter-pea, is a species of flowering plant in the family Fabaceae and is endemic to the south-west of Western Australia. It is spreading, erect, or low-lying shrub with scattered, sharply-pointed, narrow triangular phyllodes, and yellowish pink and velvety red flowers.

Description

Taxonomy and naming
Daviesia decurrens was first formally described in 1844 by Carl Meissner in Lehmann's Plantae Preissianae. The specific epithet (decurrens) means "decurrent".

In 2017, Michael Crisp and Gregory T. Chandler described two subspecies in Phytotaxa, and the names are accepted by the Australian Plant Census:

Distribution and habitat
Prickly bitter-pea grows is found from near Dongara to Busselton and eastwards to near Albany. Subspecies decurrens mostly grows in eucalypt woodland and forest, sometimes in swampland. Subspecies hamata grows in heathland and occurs further inland than subsp. decurrens, from Marchagee to Brookton and inland to near Coolgardie.

Conservation status
Both subspecies of Daviesia decurrens are classified as "not threatened" by the Western Australian Government Department of Biodiversity, Conservation and Attractions.

References

decurrens
Eudicots of Western Australia
Plants described in 1844
Taxa named by Carl Meissner